Abdel Moneim Amin (1912–1996) was an Egyptian military figure and politician. He is known for his role in the 1952 Egyptian Revolution.

Career
Amin was a Lieutenant-Colonel of the Artillery Forces in 1952. On the night of the Egyptian Revolution he ordered his troops to blockade the Suez Road and arrest officers trying to cross. He then led the troops that surrounded Ras el-Tin Palace in Alexandria, where King Farouk resided. For his achievements in the revolution he was appointed as member of the Revolutionary Council, but was forced to resign later in 1953. Between 1954 and 1956 he was Egypt's Ambassador to West Germany.

References

Egyptian military officers
Egyptian revolutionaries
1996 deaths
1912 births
Free Officers Movement (Egypt)
Governors of Aswan
Ambassadors of Egypt to West Germany
People from Desouk